Carl Colt may refer to:

Carl Colt (musician), on Little Immaculate White Fox
Carl Colt, character in Wimbledon (film)